Guo Zhenggang (born January 1970) is a former major general of the People's Liberation Army. He was detained by Chinese military authorities in February 2015, suspected of corruption.

Life and career
Guo was born in Liquan County, Shaanxi, in January 1970, the son of Guo Boxiong, former Vice Chairman of the Central Military Commission. He joined the military in March 1989. 

Guo was transferred to work in Zhejiang province, and took on several positions in the city of Zhoushan, before being transferred to work for the provincial military district. In 2013, Guo became the Director of Political Department of Zhejiang Military District.

Guo attained the rank of Major General (shao jiang) on January 14, 2015. He was promoted to Deputy Political Commissar of Zhejiang Military District. On February 10, 2015, Guo was detained for investigation by military prosecution authorities.

Guo married Wu Fangfang (born c. 1969), in the latter half of 2012. She was also detained by the authorities in early 2015.

References

1970 births
Politicians from Xianyang
Living people
People's Liberation Army generals from Shaanxi